"Let Love In" is the third and final single from the Goo Goo Dolls' eighth studio album, Let Love In.

Track listing
"Let Love In (Rock Version)" - 5:00
"Let Love In (Radio Edit)" - 4:15

Music video
The video was directed by PR Brown, and features the band performing the song, intercut with subliminal flashes of words that progress from "hunger" "war", "abuse", and the like to words such as "joy" "peace" "amazing", and "beautiful". Throughout the song, there are images of several people, including the band members. Each person is facing a slightly different angle, each one more clockwise than the last. By the end of the song, the people have completed one clockwise turn. Their expressions have also turned from sadness and defeat to hopeful, peaceful smiles.

Uses in popular culture
The song was used in a controversial 2006 television advertisement for Trojan Condoms. The commercial was pulled shortly after a negative reaction, with many thinking that the title of the song seemed a little too tongue-in-cheek for a prophylactic ad.
NBC also used this song in a clip to promote the television show The Office. The clip followed the story of Jim and Pam, prior to the episode "The Negotiation". Steve Carell has also listed it as one of his favorite songs on iTunes.

Chart positions

Weekly charts

Year-end charts

Certifications

References

2006 singles
Goo Goo Dolls songs
Song recordings produced by Glen Ballard
Songs written by John Rzeznik
Songs written by Glen Ballard
Songs written by Gregg Wattenberg
2006 songs
Warner Records singles